Phlegmariurus squarrosus is a species of lycophyte in the family Lycopodiaceae. The genus Phlegmariurus is accepted in the Pteridophyte Phylogeny Group classification of 2016 (PPG I), but not in other classifications, which submerge the genus in Huperzia, with this species as Huperzia squarrosa. The species has a wide distribution from the west Indian Ocean, through tropical and subtropical Asia to eastern Australia and the Pacific.

References

squarrosus
Flora of Australia
Flora of China
Flora of Eastern Asia
Flora of Indo-China
Flora of Malesia
Flora of Papuasia
Flora of the Indian subcontinent
Flora of the Northwestern Pacific
Flora of the south-central Pacific
Flora of the Southwestern Pacific
Flora of the Western Indian Ocean